Banat Bulgarian  may refer to:
Banat Bulgarian dialect
Banat Bulgarians

Language and nationality disambiguation pages